Adina Elizabeth Porter is an American actress. She is best known for her roles as Lettie Mae Thornton on the HBO fantasy horror series True Blood (2008–2014), Kendra James on the HBO drama series The Newsroom (2012–2014), and Indra on the CW science fiction drama series The 100 (2014–2020). She received further recognition for her roles as Sally Freeman, Lee Harris, Beverly Hope, Dinah Stevens, and Chief Burleson on the first, sixth, seventh, eighth, and tenth seasons of the FX anthology series American Horror Story (2011–present).

Porter began her acting career appearing on Off-Broadway stage, winning the Obie Award in 1996 for Venus. She made her Broadway debut in the 2001 revival of The Women. For her work in American Horror Story, she has been nominated for a Primetime Emmy Award and two Saturn Awards.

Life and career 
Porter was born and raised in New York City, New York. She graduated from the State University of New York at Purchase. Her first acting teacher was Butterfly McQueen. She has been married twice and has two children with her second husband, Larry Earl Madison Jr.

Theater 
Porter began her acting career in the theatre, appearing in off Broadway plays and in regional theatre. Her off-Broadway credits include The Debutante Ball, Jersey City, Aven' U Boys, Girl Gone, Silence, Cunning, Exile, Dancing on Moonlight and Hurricane. In 1996, she received Obie Award for Distinguished Performance by an Actress for her performance in Venus. Her Broadway debut came in 2001 with the Roundabout Theater's revival of The Women, directed by Scott Elliott, broadcast as part of PBS's Stage on Screen series, in addition, she performed in multiple productions at the New York Shakespeare Festival.

Television and film 
Porter began her screen career playing guest starring roles on television dramas include Law & Order, New York Undercover, Brooklyn South, and NYPD Blue. She had a recurring role as housekeeper Gwen Walker in the NBC period drama American Dreams from 2002 to 2003. In film, she made her debut in 1992 Leopold/Loeb New Queer Cinema feature, Swoon. She went to appear in small roles in films The Peacemaker (1997), Gia (1998), Body Shots (1999), The Fluffer (2001), and The Salon (2005). In 2005, Porter played Ricky in the film adaptation of Ruben Santiago-Hudson's play Lackawanna Blues for HBO. She received Black Reel Award for Best Supporting Actress: Television Movie/Cable for her role. She went to appear ER, Prison Break, Without a Trace, House, and Law & Order: Special Victims Unit.

In 2008, Porter was cast as Lettie Mae Thornton, mother to Rutina Wesley's Tara Thorton, in the HBO drama series, True Blood. She was promoted to series regular in seventh and final season of show. In 2012, she guest starred in an episode of Grey's Anatomy. From 2012 to 2014, she also had a recurring role on the HBO series The Newsroom playing Kendra James. In 2014, she began appearing in a recurring role as Indra in the CW post-apocalyptic drama, The 100. Porter also starred in two unsold drama pilots for ABC, Doubt in 2013, and The Jury in 2016. In 2016, she played Pearly Mae during first season of WGN America period drama Underground. Later that year, Porter was cast as Lee Harris in the FX anthology series American Horror Story: Roanoke, after previously appearing as a minor character in American Horror Story: Murder House in 2011. For her performance in Roanoke, she received critical acclaim and was nominated for a Saturn Award for Best Supporting Actress on Television. She later portrayed Beverly Hope in American Horror Story: Cult where she received similar praise from critics and received a second Saturn Award nomination, as well as a Primetime Emmy Award nomination for Outstanding Supporting Actress in a Limited Series or Movie. She was later promoted to series regular for American Horror Story’s eight season entitled Apocalypse, playing Dinah Stevens. In 2021 she appears again as a main in the tenth season of the series, called Double Feature, where she plays Chief Burleson. In 2020 she played as Sheriff Susan Peterkin in Outer Banks (TV series).

Filmography

Film

Television

Awards and nominations

References

External links 
 

Living people
Actresses from New York City
20th-century American actresses
21st-century American actresses
Obie Award recipients
American television actresses
African-American actresses
American film actresses
American stage actresses
20th-century African-American women
20th-century African-American people
21st-century African-American women
Year of birth missing (living people)